John Hannett  (born 23 June 1953) was General Secretary of the Union of Shop, Distributive and Allied Workers (USDAW).

Early life and career 
Hannett was born in Liverpool in 1953. He was a Low Pay Commissioner from 2007 to 2018. He is a former member of the TUC Executive Committee and General Council. Hannett represented Usdaw on the NEC of the Labour Party from 1998-2005. He is also a trustee of the People's History Museum in Manchester.

Usdaw
Hannett was General Secretary of Usdaw from May 2004 until June 2018, being re-elected in September 2008. Prior to this, he was Area Organiser from 1985, National Officer from 1990 and Deputy General Secretary from 1997. He was appointed an Officer of the Order of the British Empire (OBE) in the 2020 New Year Honours for services to the economy.

See also
 Paddy Lillis, General Secretary of USDAW
 Retail Week
 Martin Hannett, Manchester-born 1970s record producer
 Sunday Trading Act 1994
 Licensing Act 2003

References

External links
 USDAW

1953 births
Trade unionists from Liverpool
General Secretaries of the Union of Shop, Distributive and Allied Workers
Retailing in the United Kingdom
Living people
Members of the General Council of the Trades Union Congress
Officers of the Order of the British Empire